Sandy Stewart (born January 13, 1958 in San Francisco) is a songwriter, singer and keyboardist from Houston, Texas, USA. She is mostly known for her album Cat Dancer,  and her association with Fleetwood Mac vocalist and solo act Stevie Nicks. Sandy's first single, "Saddest Victory" was released in 1984. Its video played on MTV for several weeks, but the song never was a big hit. It reached nr 5 on bubbling under Billboard hot 100. Sandy and Stevie Nicks also sang a duet for the song "I Pretend", which also was featured on Cat Dancer. A 12" single was also released to promote Cat Dancer. The single featured a large close-up photo of Sandy on its album cover.

Sandy sang background vocals, played keyboards, synthesizer and piano for Stevie Nicks' second solo album The Wild Heart, released in 1983. She also co-wrote several songs on the album, including "If Anyone Falls", "Nothing Ever Changes" and "Nightbird". Sandy's voice can be heard on the song "Nightbird", the third single taken from the 1983 album. Sandy was credited on The Wild Heart and posed with backing vocalists Sharon Celani and Lori Perry for the album's photos. Sandy co-wrote "Maybe Love Will Change Your Mind" for Stevie Nicks' 1994 album Street Angel as well as "Too Far from Texas" for Stevie Nicks' 2001 album Trouble in Shangri-La.

In 1985, Sandy recorded a duet, "This Is Your Day", with Nile Rodgers for the soundtrack of the film White Nights, starring Mikhail Baryshnikov and Gregory Hines.

Sandy also did a TV commercial for the Japanese soft drink Mets in 1985.

In 1987, the Blue Yonder album was released. Produced by Arif Mardin and John Brand it was originally intended to be her second solo album but instead ended up as a 'band' project co-credited to her and David Munday. The song 'House of Love' was also recorded by singer, songwriter Maria Vidal on her 1987 debut solo album.  Also that year, she co-wrote "Seven Wonders" with Stevie Nicks, which was released on Tango in the Night, Fleetwood Mac's 1987 release, and also as a single. The song peaked at #19 on the U.S. Billboard Hot 100 Singles Charts and #2 on the U.S. Billboard Hot Mainstream Rock Tracks Chart. In January 2014, Stevie Nicks performed the song in the opening of the season finale of the hit show, American Horror Story: Coven. This helped the song to reach #18 on the Billboard 'Digital Rock Songs' chart with sales of 13,000 in 2014.

Along with David Munday, Sandy co-wrote the track "Falling Like Rain" which appears on Tina Turner's 1989 Foreign Affair and "Valentine" which appears on Belinda Carlisle's 1989 Runaway Horses album. Belinda has performed the song on her solo tours in recent years (even as recent as April 2016) and the song is a fan favorite. 
 
Sandy cowrote with David Munday or Rick Nowels in the 80's and 90's for such acts as Fiona, Then Jerico, Gregg Alexander, Kim Wilde, Faith Hill and Victoria Shaw.

Sandy is also involved in the Purple Songs Can Fly Project, a charitable organization described as "a unique project that provides a musical outlet for the many children being treated for cancer and blood disorders at Texas Children's Cancer Center and their siblings."

In the mid to late 2000s Sandy worked with local Texan acts in clubs and in the studio.

On November 10, 2009, Sandy Stewart's Cat Dancer album was released on CD.

Discography

Studio albums
 Cat Dancer (1984)
 Blue Yonder (1987) (as Blue Yonder)

Singles
 "Nightbird" (1983) (Stevie Nicks with Sandy Stewart)
 "Saddest Victory" (1984)
 "Windsong" (1987) (Blue Yonder)
 "House of Love" (1987) (Blue Yonder)

References

1958 births
Living people
Singer-songwriters from Texas
Stevie Nicks